"The Show" is the first single by the Australian singer/songwriter Lenka, produced by Stuart Brawley. It was released on 6 September 2008. The song is on her first album, Lenka, released in October 2008. It was promoted as an iTunes Free Single of the Week.

Track listing
 "The Show" (Album Version) – 3:55
 "Gravity Rides Everything" (The Woodstock Sessions) – 3:49

Music video
The music video has Lenka sitting on a bench in a park singing her song and picking petals from a flower. She then flies to the next scene, where she is riding a bus and looking at the other people, including an old lady and a man who she notices is staring at her. She then flies to a photo shop, where she looks at a picture with her friends. There is also a scene in which she plays tennis without ever hitting the ball. The next scene is when she is riding a bicycle with grocery items. While she is riding the bike, she notices that people are dancing while she sings the second verse. Then she flies to a concert, where she sings the chorus and flies off to a restaurant, where she and the man from the bus are eating. The man notices that Lenka's food was sliced by an unseen object. She then goes to her house, in which her toothbrush brushes her teeth without her holding it, and she slowly goes to bed. She finishes by watching the TV (where everyone is singing her song along with her) and turning out the lights.

Media use
It was used as the soundtrack for a 2008 Old Navy commercial, as an Ugly Betty season 3 2008 promo, in the 2008 film Angus, Thongs and Perfect Snogging, for the 2009 spring campaign of the Polish TV station TVN, in a 2009 commercial for the Malaysian telecommunications company TM, and in a 2010 commercial for the French insurance company GMF. Samples from the song were used in DFS sofa commercials in the UK. The song was covered by Kerris Dorsey in the 2011 movie Moneyball (set in 2002) and appears on its soundtrack. In addition, it was featured in the Korean television show My Love from the Star .
In 2019, Japanese group Momoiro Cover Z covered the song with some new and original lyrics.

Charts

Weekly charts

Year-end charts

Release history

References

2008 debut singles
Lenka songs
Songs written by Jason Reeves (songwriter)
2008 songs